"Dangerous" is a song by Canadian rapper Kardinal Offishall featuring American singer Akon. Produced by DJ Kemo and hAZEL, it was the first single from his fourth album, Not 4 Sale. It was released to radio in March 2008, and on iTunes on April 1. On the week of May 13, at the American iTunes Store, the song was offered as a free download (Single of the Week). The song won the award for Single of the Year at the 2009 Juno Awards. In January 2023, the single was certified 4× platinum by Music Canada.

Music video
The music video was shot in Miami, Florida and directed by Gil Green. It debuted in early May on AOL.com. It starts off with a girl (Chanta Patton) passing by Kardinal, Akon, and friends as all of them watch her and follow her. Most of the scenes start by zooming out of objects such as sunglasses, a drinking cup, etc. It has scenes in a restaurant, a club, and a beach. There are cameo appearances in the video by DJ Khaled, Red Cafe, Black Chiney, Clinton Sparks, and more.

Formats and track listings

CD single
"Dangerous" (Main Version)
"Dangerous" (Remix) (featuring Akon and Sean Paul)

12" single
A-side
"Dangerous" (Clean)
"Dangerous" (Remix) (featuring Akon and Sean Paul)

B-side
"Dangerous" (Explicit)
"Dangerous" (Instrumental)

Remixes
There are three official remixes for "Dangerous". The first is a soca remix which uses a different beat, and retains the original lyrics. The second remix features Akon and Sean Paul, using the original beat, with new lyrics by Kardinal and Sean Paul. The third remix uses a different beat, and features Akon, Sean Paul, and Twista.

Chart performance
After being released by the Canadian iTunes Store, the song quickly raced to the top 10 on the Top 100 songs list, peaking at number three. As a result of this, it debuted on the Canadian Hot 100 the following week at number nine, and in early July, the song peaked at number two. On the issue date of May 17, the song debuted on the US Billboard Bubbling Under Hot 100 Singles chart, making it Kardinal's third single to make an appearance on a U.S. Billboard chart, and his first since "Belly Dancer" in 2003. The following week, the single debuted at number 91 on the Billboard Hot 100, and later peaked at number five, making him the first Canadian rapper to have a song chart on the Hot 100. In early October 2008, the single was released in the UK on iTunes. The single achieved moderate success there, peaking at number 16 on the UK Singles Chart.

Charts

Weekly charts

Year-end charts

Certifications and sales

Other appearances
"Dangerous" was featured in a dance routine performed by A.S.I.I.D., in an episode of America's Best Dance Crew. The song was also featured on So You Think You Can Dance Canada, during a hip-hop dance performance by Dario Milard and Romina D'Ugo. The "Dangerous" remix, featuring Akon and Sean Paul, is featured in the 2009 video game expansion pack, Grand Theft Auto IV: The Lost and Damned.

Resurgence
"Dangerous" had a resurgence on TikTok in early 2021 where users would switch the angle of the camera that they're looking from, because of the resurgence, the song ranked 50 on the Spotify Viral 50 chart.

References

External links

2008 singles
Kardinal Offishall songs
Akon songs
Songs written by Akon
Songs written by Kardinal Offishall
Music videos directed by Gil Green
2008 songs
Geffen Records singles
Juno Award for Single of the Year singles